Reto Elias Grütter (17 July 1984) is a Swiss sidecarcross passenger and the 2007 and 2008 Sidecarcross World Champion.

Reto Grütter's name can sometimes be found to be, wrongfully, spelled Reto Grutter.

Sidecarcross world championship results 
Reto Grütter entered the sidecarcross world championship in 2003 as a nineteen-year-old in the French GP in Pernes Les Fontains, 27 April 2003, becoming the passenger for his countryman Ueli Müller. They raced together in the world championship for four seasons from 2003 to 2006, a 15th place overall in 2005 being their best result but never finishing better than eighth in a race. After the 2006 season, Grütter replaced the Belgian Sven Verbrugge as passenger for Daniël Willemsen who had won his fifth world championship this season. The new combination Willemsen / Grütter dominated the 2007 season in clear fashion, winning 15 out of 16 races and retaining Team Willemsens world championship. Grütter won his first GP on 9 April 2007 in the season opener in Oldebroek, Netherlands.  On top of the world championship, the combination also took out the Dutch title.  In the 2008 season, Grütter continued to race with Willemsen but an injury prevented him from taking part in the first race of the season and Willemsen replaced him with Bruno Kaelin for the first round. In race fourteen of the season, the team was disqualified after winning the race due to Grütter losing a glove, after a protest by Kristers Sergis. The team took out the 2008 world championship with a 97-point margin to second-placed Kristers Sergis.

At the end of the 2008 season, Willemsen and Grütter split and the later was without a ride for the 2009 world championship season. He raced with Andy Bürgler in the 2009 Swiss championship, winning the national title comfortably.

Season by season

Source:
 Passengers in italics.

Honours

World Championship
 Champions: (2) 2007, 2008

Belgium
 Champions: (1) 2007

Netherlands
 Champions: (2) 2007, 2008

Switzerland
 Champions: (2) 2002, 2009

References

External links 
 Team Willemsen website
 Reto Grütter at Motorsport aktuell 
 The World Championship on Sidecarcross.com

1984 births
Living people
Swiss sidecarcross riders
Sportspeople from Aargau